Dofari (also Romanized as Dofārī; also known as Dafūrī, De Fowrī, Deh Fārī, and Dowfūrī) is a village in Howmeh Rural District, in the Central District of Qeshm County, Hormozgan Province, Iran. At the 2006 census, its population was 138, in 35 families.

References 

Populated places in Qeshm County